Deborah Jowitt is an American dance critic, author, and choreographer. Her career in dance began as a performer and choreographer. Jowitt has received several awards for her work, including a Bessie (New York Dance and Performance Award) for her work in dance criticism.

Beginning in 1967, she wrote a weekly dance column for the Village Voice, providing frequent reviews of dance performances in New York City. From some time in the 1970s until 1994, the Voice had a page and a half for dance coverage: Jowitt contributed 1600 words or a full page of this, week after week, plus occasional features.  Collections of her reviews from the Voice and numerous other publications have appeared as books - Dance Beat: Views and Reviews, New York: Marcel Dekker, 1977 and The Dance in Mind: Profiles and Reviews, 1976–1983, Boston: David R. Godine, 1985.

In 2007 her column in the Village Voice was increased in length to 3/4 page, having been earlier reduced to a half-page; in 2008, however, her position as dance critic was converted from full-time to freelance. However, Jowitt continues to write 3/4 page reviews for the Voice and writes reviews for the Voice on-line edition. She is a faculty member at the Tisch School of the Arts at New York University (NYU).

Awards
 2005, a special citation from the Society of Dance History Scholars (SDHS) for Jerome Robbins: His Life, His Theater, His Dance.
 2001, the "Outstanding Contribution to Dance Research" award from Congress on Research in Dance (CORD).
 1988, the de la Torre Bueno Prize for the best book in the field of dance studies for Time and the Dancing Image.
 1985, a special citation from the SDHS for The Dance in Mind.

External links
 NYU Faculty: Deborah Jowitt
 Sarma Critics: Deborah Jowitt
 Society of Dance History Scholars Awards
 Arts Catter
 Village Voice

Living people
American choreographers
American dance critics
Dance historians
Tisch School of the Arts faculty
Bessie Award winners
American women journalists
21st-century American historians
American women historians
American women critics
21st-century American women writers
Year of birth missing (living people)